In mathematics, in the realm of group theory, a group is said to be capable if it occurs as the inner automorphism group of some group.  These groups were first studied by Reinhold Baer, who showed that a finite abelian group is capable if and only if it is a product of cyclic groups of orders n1,...,nk where ni divides ni+1 and nk–1=nk.

References

External links
 Bounds on the index of the center in capable groups

Properties of groups